Cheng Kejie (13 November 1933 – 14 September 2000) was a Chinese government official who was executed for bribery.

Cheng was born in Guangxi, and joined the Chinese Communist Party (CCP) in February 1954, rising to become governor of Guangxi region and vice-chairman of the Standing Committee of the National People's Congress.  Cheng was involved with Li Ping, (described as his mistress) and was convicted of corruption along with her. It is alleged that the two spent the money gained from corruption for gambling in Macau. Li was sentenced to life imprisonment.  K. Thomas Liaw estimates that 95 percent of China's convicted corrupt officials had mistresses. According to Liaw, Cheng and Li had decided to divorce their respective spouses and get married and that Cheng had taken a bribe of Renminbi 40 million to fund their marriage.

Cheng Kejie is the only party and state leader in the history of the People's Republic of China who has been executed by the judicial authorities so far.

See also
Zheng Xiaoyu

References

1933 births
2000 deaths
Chinese politicians executed for corruption
Vice Chairpersons of the National People's Congress
Political office-holders in Guangxi
20th-century executions by China
People executed by China by lethal injection
Expelled members of the Chinese Communist Party
Zhuang people